Hayden Book Company (abbreviated Hayden Book Co.) was an imprint of MacMillan Computer Publishing USA that published computing books, with a particular emphasis on the Macintosh platform and desktop design. Video games and educational software for home computers, such as Championship Golf, were published as Hayden Software.

References

Book publishing companies of the United States